The Singapore Justice Party (abbreviation: SJP) is a political party in Singapore.

Background
The party has been based mostly in Marine Parade district of Singapore since the party has taken part in general elections after 1988 by fielding its candidates at Marine Parade Group Representation Constituency (GRC). In 1997, it did not take part in the General Election. In the run-up to the 2001 general election, responding to Chiam See Tong's call for a united front against the ruling People's Action Party, the party joined with the National Solidarity Party, the Singapore People's Party and the Singapore Malay National Organisation to form the Singapore Democratic Alliance (SDA). Although the party itself failed to win any seats since it was formed, the SDA did manage to win one seat at Potong Pasir, with Chiam See Tong of the Singapore People's Party as Member of Parliament and have another (Steve Chia of the National Solidarity Party) in parliament through the Non-Constituency Member of Parliament (NCMP) scheme.

As of March 2006, the party's Secretary General is Aminuddin bin Ami.

References

A small introduction on Justice Party

Political parties in Singapore
1972 establishments in Singapore
Political parties established in 1972